Zuma Beach is a 1978 TV movie written by John Carpenter & William Schwartz from a story by John Herman Shaner & Al Ramrus and directed by Lee H. Katzin and starring Suzanne Somers.

Plot
A fading rock singer goes to the beach to get away from it all and winds up getting involved in the lives of the teenage beachgoers.

Cast 
 Suzanne Somers as Bonnie Katt 
 Steven Keats as Jerry McCabe
 Mark Wheeler as David Hunter
 Kimberly Beck as Cathy
 Perry Lang as Billy
 Michael Biehn as J.D.
 Biff Warren as Norman
 Les Lannom as Stan
 Rosanna Arquette as Beverly
 Gary Imhoff as Frank
 Leonard Stone as Johnson
 Steve Franken as Rick
 Richard Molinare as Frank
 Tanya Roberts as Denise
 P.J. Soles as Nancy 
 Timothy Hutton as Art
 Janus Blythe as Jennifer

History
Suzanne Somers' fame was rising due to the success of the sitcom Three's Company, and she wanted to star in movies. Although a lightweight TV movie, Zuma Beach provided Somers with her first starring movie role.

John Carpenter wrote the script for a producer "who just said he wanted a beach movie." He sold it to Warner Bros., and it became a TV movie to star Suzanne Somers. Carpenter said he "was going to direct it, for about 10 seconds, but one of my mentors, Richard Kobritz...helped me see I didn’t want to do it. It was vastly rewritten, so I really shouldn’t have taken credit for it, but I was a little asshole in those days."

Tim Hutton had one of his first roles in the film.

Reception
The Los Angeles Times praised the naturalness of Somers' performance.

References

External links 

Full movie on archive.org

1978 television films
1978 films
1978 comedy-drama films
American comedy-drama television films
NBC network original films
Films directed by Lee H. Katzin
Films with screenplays by John Carpenter
Films set on beaches
Films shot in California
Beach party films
1970s English-language films
1970s American films